Theria (Greek:  , wild beast) is a subclass of mammals amongst the Theriiformes. Theria includes the eutherians (including the placental mammals) and the metatherians (including the marsupials) but excludes the egg-laying monotremes and various extinct mammals evolving prior to the common ancestor of placentals and marsupials.

Characteristics 
Therian mammals give birth (see viviparity) to live young without a shelled egg. This is possible thanks to key proteins called syncytins which allow exchanges between the mother and its offspring through a placenta, even rudimental ones such as in marsupials. Genetic studies have suggested a viral origin of syncytins through the endogenization process.

The marsupials and the placental mammals evolved from a common therian ancestor that gave live birth by suppressing the mother's immune system. While the marsupials continued to give birth to an underdeveloped fetus after a short pregnancy, the ancestors of placental mammals gradually evolved a prolonged pregnancy.

Therian mammals no longer have the coracoid bone, contrary to their cousins, monotremes.

Pinnae (external ears) are also a distinctive trait that is a therian exclusivity, though some therians, such as the earless seals, have lost them secondarily.

Evolution 
The earliest known therian mammal fossil is Juramaia, from the Late Jurassic (Oxfordian stage) of China . However, the age estimates of the site are disputed based on the geological complexity and the geographically widespread nature of the Tiaojishan Formations. Further, King and Beck in 2020 argue for an Early Cretaceous age for Juramaia sinensis, in line with similar early mammaliaformes.

A recent review of the Southern Hemisphere Meosozoic mammal fossil record has argued that triosphenic mammals arose in the Southern Hemisphere during the Early Jurassic, around 50 million years prior to the clade's earliest undisputed appearance in the Northern Hemisphere.

Molecular data suggests that therians may have originated even earlier, during the Early Jurassic. Therian mammals began to diversify 10-20 million years before dinosaur extinction.

Taxonomy

The rank of "Theria" may vary depending on the classification system used.  The textbook classification system by Vaughan et al. (2000) gives the following:

In the above system Theria is a subclass.  Alternatively, in the system proposed by
McKenna and Bell (1997) it is ranked as a supercohort under the subclass Theriiformes:

Another classification proposed by Luo et al. (2002) does not assign any rank to the taxonomic levels, but uses a purely cladistic system instead.

See also
 Marsupials
 Marsupionta
 Monotremes
 Placental mammals

References

External links

 Theria — supercohort — Tree of Life

 
Mammal taxonomy
Extant Middle Jurassic first appearances
Taxa described in 1897
Taxa named by William Aitcheson Haswell